Tovarkovo is a rural locality (a village) in Bavlenskoye Rural Settlement, Kolchuginsky District, Vladimir Oblast, Russia. The population was 16 as of 2010.

Geography 
Tovarkovo is located 19 km northeast of Kolchugino (the district's administrative centre) by road. Bolshoye Kuzminskoye is the nearest rural locality.

References 

Rural localities in Kolchuginsky District